Olivier Schultheis (born 29 April 1965) is a musician, a lyricist, a composer and a conductor. He won the top prize of Conservatoire National de Musique de Paris for his absolute pitch technique.

He became the music conductor in French TV show Nouvelle Star (adaptation of American Idol) and he is now a judge in X Factor on M6 (for the second series in 2011), next to Véronic DiCaire, Henry Padovani and Christophe Willem. His father is Jean Schultheis and his brother is Julien Schultheis.

Albums composer
À l'envers, (2004) by Steeve Estatof
Le Roi Soleil (2005)
Thierry Amiel (2006) by Thierry Amiel
Quand l'éternité...(2006) by Hélène Ségara
Inventaire (2007) by Christophe Willem
Mon Paradis (2007) by Christophe Maé
Mozart, l'opéra rock (musical, 2008)
Best of VO/VS (2010) by Calogero
Donne moi le temps by Jennifer

References

External links 
 X Factor website (series 1) 
 X Factor website (series 2) 
 Olivier Schultheis page at Discogs

1965 births
Living people
French composers
French male composers